Guido Pella was the defending champion, but decided not to participate.
Michael Russell defeated Greg Jones 4–6, 6–0, 7–5 in the final to win the title.

Seeds

Draw

Finals

Top half

Bottom half

References
 Main Draw
 Qualifying Draw

Manta Open - Singles
2013 Singles